The 2016 season is the inaugural season of the San Diego Breakers.

2016 season

Ladder

Ladder progression

Rugby union in California
2016 in sports in California